Johanna Maria Jansson (born 10 June 1987), better known by her stage name Dotter, is a Swedish singer and songwriter. She finished second in Melodifestivalen 2020 with her song "Bulletproof", one point behind The Mamas. In Melodifestivalen 2021, where she competed with the song "Little Tot", she placed fourth with 105 points.

Career

Dotter was born on 10 June 1987 in Arvika. She later moved to Stockholm and studied at the Kulturama music school. She chose the stage name "Dotter" (English: daughter) because she considers herself a "daughter of Mother Earth" due to her vegan lifestyle. She cites her major musical influences as Jefferson Airplane, Joni Mitchell, First Aid Kit, and Florence and the Machine. Her debut single "My Flower" was released in 2014, and she later performed at Musikhjälpen which was broadcast on SVT.

Dotter co-wrote the song "A Million Years" by Mariette Hansson for Melodifestivalen 2017. It went on to place fourth in the final. The following year, Dotter competed as a soloist in Melodifestivalen 2018 with the song "Cry". Despite being a favourite to win the competition, she placed sixth in her semi-final and was eliminated.

She co-wrote the song "Victorious" performed by Lina Hedlund in Melodifestivalen 2019. It went on to place eleventh in the final. In the same festival Dotter performed the duet "Walk with Me" along with Måns Zelmerlöw as an interval act during the Second Chance round.

She returned as a performer one year later, competing in Melodifestivalen 2020 with the song "Bulletproof"; Dotter competed in the second semi-final on 8 February, where she qualified directly for the final. She finished in second place, scoring a total of 136 points, one point behind the winning song.

She took part again in Melodifestivalen 2021, with the song "Little Tot". She qualified directly for the final from the second semi-final, alongside Anton Ewald. Despite being an early favourite to win the contest, she placed fourth in the final.

She also announced the points on behalf of the Swedish jury at the contest.

Personal life
Dotter is vegan and is an animal rights activist. She speaks four languages: Swedish, English, Spanish, and Bosnian.
She is engaged to Bosnian-Swedish musician Dino Medanhodžić and gave birth to a daughter on 12 October 2022. Her pregnancy was publicly revealed during her appearance at the 2022 Eurovision Song Contest as the Swedish spokesperson to announce the 12-point score from the Swedish jury.

Discography

Singles

References

Notes

External links

1987 births
21st-century Swedish women singers
21st-century Swedish singers
Living people
People from Arvika Municipality
Swedish women singers
Swedish women singer-songwriters
Swedish singer-songwriters
Swedish pop singers
Warner Music Group artists
Melodifestivalen contestants of 2021
Melodifestivalen contestants of 2020
Melodifestivalen contestants of 2018